A characteristic is a distinguishing feature of a person or thing. It may refer to:

Computing
 Characteristic (biased exponent), an ambiguous term formerly used by some authors to specify some type of exponent of a floating point number
 Characteristic (significand), an ambiguous term formerly used by some authors to specify the significand of a floating point number

Science
I–V or current–voltage characteristic, the current in a circuit as a function of the applied voltage
Receiver operating characteristic

Mathematics
 Characteristic (algebra) of a ring, the smallest common cycle length of the ring's addition operation
 Characteristic (logarithm), integer part of a common logarithm
 Characteristic function, usually the indicator function of a subset, though the term has other meanings in specific domains
 Characteristic polynomial, a polynomial associated with a square matrix in linear algebra
 Characteristic subgroup, a subgroup that is invariant under all automorphisms in group theory
 Characteristic value, another name for the eigenvalue of a matrix
 Characteristic vector (disambiguation), another name for eigenvector of a matrix
 Characteristic word, a subclass of Sturmian word
 Euler characteristic, a topological invariant
 Method of characteristics, a technique for solving partial differential equations

Other uses
 Light characteristic, pattern of a lighted beacon
 Another name for ability score in Dungeons & Dragons

See also
 
 Characteristicks, a 1711 philosophical treatise by Anthony Ashley-Cooper, 3rd Earl of Shaftesbury